Rochdale Association Football Club is an English professional association football club based in the town of Rochdale in Greater Manchester. The club plays in the Football League Two, the fourth tier in the English football league system. The club's colours are black and blue and they play their home games at Spotland Stadium, which has a capacity of 10,249. Formed in 1907 and nicknamed the Dale, they were accepted into the Football League in 1921. Since then, the club has remained in the bottom two professional divisions of English Football.

History 
Rochdale A.F.C. was formed in 1907. After World War I the Football League was expanded and the club unsuccessfully applied to join. In 1921 Rochdale was recommended to be included in the new Third Division North, and played their first League game at home against Accrington Stanley on 27 August 1921, winning 6–3. However, this first season ended with the club at the bottom of the League, having to reapply for membership.

The club reached the League Cup final in 1962. This was the first time a club from the bottom league division had reached the final of a major competition – where they lost to Norwich City.

The club's first promotion came in 1969, earned by a team largely assembled by manager Bob Stokoe, though it was Stokoe's assistant, Len Richley who steered Rochdale to promotion after Stokoe moved to Carlisle United. In the early stages of the 1969–70 season, Rochdale topped the Division Three table, sparking hopes of a second successive promotion. The team's form significantly declined around Christmas 1969, however, and a failure to halt the team's decline led to the dismissal of Richley. He was succeeded by Dick Conner, who stabilised the club's form and steered them to a 9th-place finish. The following three seasons saw the club finish in the lower reaches of the Division Three table, narrowly avoiding relegation each time. The board viewed merely surviving in Division Three as unacceptable and replaced Conner with Walter Joyce for the 1973–74 season. This move failed to pay off, and Rochdale was relegated after a campaign in which they won only 2 of 46 league games.

The club finished bottom of the league in 1977–78, but was successful in their bid for re-election. Rochdale finished bottom for a second time in 1979–80, but was again re-elected – by one vote over Altrincham. In 1989–90 the club reached the fifth round of the FA Cup for the first time, but lost 1–0 to Crystal Palace.

The club reached the fifth round of the FA Cup again in 2003, but lost 3–1 at Wolverhampton.

Keith Hill, initially appointed as caretaker-manager in December 2006, became arguably the club's most successful manager to date. Hill and his assistant manager David Flitcroft led Rochdale to a 5th-placed finish in 2007–08, securing a play-off place. After beating Darlington 5–4 on penalties in the semi-finals, Rochdale reached Wembley for the first time in their history. Despite taking the lead in the match, they lost the final 3–2 to Stockport County.

In the 2008–09 season, Rochdale reached the League Two play-offs for the second consecutive season but lost 2–1 on aggregate to Gillingham in the playoff semi-finals.

The next season ended a 41-year wait for promotion with a win over Northampton Town as Rochdale secured the third automatic promotion spot. Rochdale continued their progression under Keith Hill, now with the club for 4 years, finishing 9th in the League One with 68 points, equaling their highest league finish since 1969–70.

On 1 June 2011 manager Keith Hill joined Championship side Barnsley. Former Manchester City apprentice and youth coach Steve Eyre was confirmed as Hill's replacement on 12 June 2011. Eyre's spell at Spotland did not last long, as he was sacked after 27 competitive games in charge, the team having recorded just 4 league wins in this time.

On 24 January 2012, Accrington Stanley's John Coleman was confirmed manager as the successor to Steve Eyre and left his club where he had been for more than a decade. John Coleman's first match in charge was a 3–0 win at home over Bury in the local derby. However, on 21 April, Rochdale lost 2–1 to Chesterfield resulting in relegation from League One after two years in the league. John Coleman's and Jimmy Bell's contracts were terminated by Rochdale on 21 January 2013 following a poor run in form. In January 2013, Keith Hill, previously in charge of Rochdale from 2007 to 2011, was appointed as the new manager.

Rochdale were promoted to League One on 26 April 2014, after beating Cheltenham Town 2–0. Playing at the club's highest level the 2014–15 season was the club's most successful yet. Apart from a couple of games, they remained in the top half of the league all season, eventually finishing in eighth place, their highest league placing.

Key

Key to league record
 Level = Level of the league in the current league system
 Pld = Games played
 W = Games won
 D = Games drawn
 L = Games lost
 GF = Goals for
 GA = Goals against
 GD = Goals difference
 Pts = Points
 Position = Position in the final league table
 Top scorer and number of goals scored shown in bold when he was also top scorer for the division.

Key to cup records
 Res = Final reached round
 Rec = Final club record in the form of wins-draws-losses
 PR = Preliminary round
 QR1 (2, etc.) = Qualifying Cup rounds
 G = Group stage
 R1 (2, etc.) = Proper Cup rounds
 QF = Quarter-finalists
 SF = Semi-finalists
 F = Finalists
 A (QF, SF, F) = Area quarter-, semi-, finalists
 W = Winners

Seasons

References

Seasons
 
Rochdale